is a Japanese sport shooter. Kobayashi represented Japan at the 2008 Summer Olympics in Beijing, where he competed in two pistol shooting events, along with his teammate Tomoyuki Matsuda. He scored a total of 577 targets in the preliminary rounds of the men's 10 m air pistol, by four points ahead of Poland's Wojciech Knapik from the final attempt, finishing only in twenty-third place. Three days later, Kobayashi placed tenth in his second event, 50 m rifle pistol, by one point behind Matsuda from the final attempt, with a total score of 558 targets.

References

External links
NBC 2008 Olympics profile

Japanese male sport shooters
Living people
Olympic shooters of Japan
Shooters at the 2008 Summer Olympics
Sportspeople from Okayama
1973 births
Asian Games medalists in shooting
Shooters at the 2002 Asian Games
Shooters at the 2006 Asian Games
Shooters at the 2010 Asian Games
Asian Games bronze medalists for Japan
Medalists at the 2010 Asian Games
21st-century Japanese people